ERO or ero may refer to:

Science and technology
 Easily Recoverable Objet, a subclass of near-Earth object that is easily recoverable
 Early Release Observations, of the James Webb Space Telescope
 Edge recombination operator, an operator in genetic algorithms
 Elementary row operations, an operation performed on the rows of an elementary matrix in mathematics
 Ero, a genus of pirate spiders
 Extremely Red Object, astronomical source of radiation with extreme redshift

Government
 Education Review Office (New Zealand), an agency of the New Zealand government
 Electoral registration officer, in the UK, a person appointed by a local authority to compile and maintain the electoral roll
 Electronic return originator, an authorized IRS e-file provider which originates the electronic submission of a return
 Enforcement and Removal Operations, a section of U.S. Immigration and Customs Enforcement
 The Emergency Regulations Ordinance (Cap. 241) of Hong Kong

Organizations
 Eugenics Record Office (1910-1939), a center for eugenics and human heredity research in America
 ICFTU European Regional Organisation (1950-1969), regional confederation of trade unions
 European Radiocommunications Office, former name of the European Communications Office, part of the European Conference of Postal and Telecommunications Administrations
 Emergency response officers (EROs) are people who are trained to be the first line of response in any emergency situation.

Art
 ERO (Dominique Philbert) (1967-2011), American graffiti artist.

Other uses
 Ero, an abbot in The Legend of Ero of Armenteira
 Končar-Arma ERO, a Croatian submachine gun similar to the Israeli-made Uzi submachine gun

See also
 Eros (disambiguation)
 EROS (disambiguation)